Daan Remmerts de Vries (born 5 April 1962) is a Dutch writer and illustrator.

Career 

Remmerts de Vries made his debut in 1990 with Zippy en Slos, a collection of short stories.

He won the Gouden Griffel award twice: in 2003, for his book Godje and, in 2010, for his book Voordat jij er was. He also won the Zilveren Griffel award in 2015 for Soms laat ik je even achter and in 2017 for T.rex Trix in Naturalis.

In 2021, he won the Theo Thijssen-prijs for his entire oeuvre.

Remmerts de Vries has illustrated books written by several authors, including Ted van Lieshout, Sjoerd Kuyper and Francine Oomen. He has also illustrated many of his own books.

Awards 

 1997: Vlag en Wimpel, Mijn tuin, mijn tuin (written by Ted van Lieshout)
 2000: Vlag en Wimpel, Willis
 2003: Gouden Griffel, Godje
 2005: Zilveren Griffel, De Noordenwindheks
 2009: Vlag en Wimpel, Bernie King en de magische cirkels
 2010: Gouden Griffel, Voordat jij er was
 2015: Zilveren Griffel, Soms laat ik je even achter
 2017: Zilveren Griffel, T.rex Trix in Naturalis
 2018: Vlag en Wimpel, De cycloop
 2021: Theo Thijssen-prijs, entire oeuvre

References

External links 

 Daan Remmerts de Vries (in Dutch), Digital Library for Dutch Literature

1962 births
Living people
Dutch children's writers
Dutch male writers
Dutch children's book illustrators
Gouden Griffel winners